Thomas and the Magic Railroad is a 2000 children's fantasy adventure film written and directed by Britt Allcroft and produced by Allcroft and Phil Fehrle. It is the only theatrical live-action/animated Thomas & Friends film in the franchise. The film stars Alec Baldwin as Mr. Conductor, Peter Fonda, Mara Wilson, Didi Conn, Russell Means, Cody McMains, Michael E. Rodgers, and the voices of Eddie Glen and Neil Crone. The film is based on the British children's book series The Railway Series by the Reverend W. Awdry, its televised adaptation Thomas & Friends by Allcroft, and the American television series Shining Time Station by Allcroft and Rick Siggelkow. The film tells the story of Lily Stone (Wilson), the granddaughter of the caretaker (Fonda) of an enchanted steam engine who is lacking an appropriate supply of coal, and Mr. Conductor (Baldwin) of Shining Time Station, whose provisions of magical gold dust are at a critical low. To ameliorate these problems, Lily and Mr. Conductor enlist the help of Thomas the Tank Engine (Glen), who confronts the ruthless, steam engine-hating Diesel 10 (Crone) along the way.

Plans for an original Thomas & Friends film started with Paramount Pictures, but were not carried through. Shortly afterward, Destination Films began funding the project and production started in 1998. Filming took place at the Strasburg Rail Road, in Pennsylvania, in Toronto, Canada, and on the Isle of Man. The film underwent extensive editing following poor test screenings, resulting in the removal of the majority of scenes featuring Doug Lennox's character P.T. Boomer – who was originally intended to be the story's primary antagonist – and the recasting of several voice actors.

Thomas and the Magic Railroad premiered at the Odeon Leicester Square in the United Kingdom on July 9, 2000. It was panned by critics upon release, mainly from the UK where Shining Time Station had not been broadcast, with criticism of the acting, plot, special effects, and lack of fidelity to its source material. The film was a box office bomb, grossing $19.7 million worldwide against a production budget of $19 million; Allcroft resigned from her company in September 2000 due to the film's poor performance. HiT Entertainment acquired the company two years later, including the television rights to Thomas. As of October 2020, a second theatrical live-action/animated Thomas & Friends film is in development at Mattel Films, a division of Mattel, the current owner of HiT Entertainment, with Marc Forster serving as director.

Plot

Sir Topham Hatt and his family have left the Island of Sodor on holiday, leaving Mr. Conductor in charge of the engines. Gordon complains to Thomas about being late by eight seconds when Diesel 10 races by, scaring both engines. Meanwhile, in Shining Time, Mr. Conductor is suffering a crisis; his supply of magic gold dust is alarmingly low and not enough for him to travel back from Sodor. At Tidmouth Sheds, Thomas is talking to James, when Diesel 10 arrives and announces his plan to rid Sodor of steam engines by finding and destroying Lady, the lost engine, the key to steam engines living in peace. Thomas leaves to collect Mr. Conductor. Lady is hidden in a workshop on Muffle Mountain by her driver, Burnett Stone, after Diesel 10's previous attempt to destroy her. Lady is unable to steam despite trying all of the coals in Indian Valley. At the sheds, the steam engines conclude that they should find Lady before Diesel 10, unaware that subordinates of Diesel 10, Splatter and Dodge, are spying on them. That night, Diesel 10 approaches the shed where the steam engines are sleeping and destroys the side of it with his claw. Mr. Conductor tries to keep him in order, but the gold dust fails and Mr. Conductor scares Diesel 10 away by threatening to pour a bag of sugar in his fuel tanks.

Burnett's granddaughter, Lily, is visiting her grandfather. She meets a dog named Mutt at the railway station. Lily meets Mr. Conductor's cousin Junior and Stacy Jones before she is taken to Burnett's house. Mr. Conductor calls his cousin, Mr. C. Junior, to help him with his gold dust crisis. That night, Percy and Thomas conclude there is a secret railway between Sodor and Shining Time. After spying on their conversation, Diesel 10 goes to the smelters yard to tell Splatter and Dodge of his plans to destroy Lady. Observing this, Toby distracts Diesel 10 by ringing his bell, causing Diesel 10 to knock one of the supports out from the shed with his claw, which collapses the roof on top of them. The next morning, Thomas collects six coal trucks for Henry, and one of them accidentally rolls through the buffers that lead to the secret railway. Later that day, Mr. Conductor is abducted by Diesel 10, who threatens to drop him off a viaduct unless he divulges the location of the buffers, but Mr. Conductor cuts one of the claw's hydraulic hoses with a pair of tin snips, and is thrown free. He lands at the Sodor windmill, where he finds a clue to the source of the gold dust.

Lily meets Patch, who takes her to Shining Time, where she meets Junior again. Junior takes her through the Magic Railroad to Sodor, where they meet Thomas. Thomas is not happy to see Junior, but agrees to help him and Lily and takes them to the windmill, where they find Mr. Conductor. Junior climbs onto one of the sails and is thrown onto Diesel 10's roof. Later that night, Percy finds that Splatter and Dodge have found the Sodor entrance to the Magic Railroad and goes to warn Thomas. Thomas agrees to take Lily home. While traveling through the Magic Railroad, Thomas discovers the missing coal truck, which he collects. Lily goes to find Burnett, leaving Thomas stranded. Thomas rolls down the mountain and re-enters the Magic Railroad through another secret portal. Meanwhile, Junior reunites with Mr. Conductor after managing to escape with James from Diesel 10 by using the last of his gold dust.

Lily finds Burnett in his workshop and he explains the problem getting Lady to steam. Lily suggests using a special coal from Sodor. Patch retrieves the truck and Burnett uses the coal to start Lady. Now steaming, Lady takes Burnett, Lily, Patch and Mutt along the Magic Railroad. Thomas arrives and the two engines return to Sodor, where they meet Mr. Conductor and Junior. Diesel 10 arrives with Splatter and Dodge, who decide to stop helping him. Diesel 10 chases Thomas and Lady to the viaduct, where the steam engines make it safely across, but the viaduct collapses under Diesel 10's weight, and he falls and lands onto a barge filled with sludge.

Thomas, Lady and Burnett return to the grotto; Lily combines water from a wishing well and shavings from the Magic Railroad to make more gold dust. Junior decides to go to work on Sodor and Mr. Conductor gives him his conductor's hat before sending him to another railway. Lily, Burnett, Patch and Mutt return to Shining Time, and Lady returns to the Magic Railroad while Thomas travels home into the sunset.

Cast

Live-action cast
 Alec Baldwin as Mr. Conductor
 Peter Fonda as Burnett Stone, Lily's grandfather and Lady's caretaker and driver.
 Jared Wall as young Burnett
 Mara Wilson as Lily Stone, Burnett's granddaughter.
 Michael E. Rodgers as Mr. C. Junior, Mr. Conductor's lazy cousin.
 Cody McMains as Patch, a young teenage boy who works with Burnett Stone.
 Didi Conn as Stacy Jones, Matt and Dan's aunt, and the manager of Shining Time.
 Russell Means as Billy Twofeathers. He was previously played by Tom Jackson on Shining Time Station.
 Lori Hallier as Mrs. Stone, Lily's mother and Burnett's daughter.
 Laura Bower as Tasha Stone, Burnett's late wife and Lily's deceased grandmother.
Additionally, Doug Lennox was cast as P.T. Boomer, Burnett's rival and an emotionally muddy biker man until his scenes were cut from the film entirely. Robert Tinkler portrayed Patch as an adult in scenes that were also not included in the final cut.

Voice cast

 Eddie Glen as Thomas, a blue anthropomorphic tank engine who runs his own branch line.
 Britt Allcroft as Lady, a small, magenta, Victorian-styled tank engine owned by Burnett Stone, who runs the Magic Railroad.
 Neil Crone as
 Diesel 10, an evil diesel engine with a hydraulic claw he affectionately calls "Pinchy", who hates steam engines and wants to destroy them, especially the magic engine Lady.
 Splatter, a bumbling diesel and Dodge's twin.
 Gordon, a big blue tender engine who does the main line express.
 A tumbleweed with a Southern-American accent.
 Kevin Frank as
 Dodge, a bumbling diesel and Splatter's twin.
 Henry, a green mixed-traffic tender engine.
 Bertie, a red bus who likes to race with Thomas.
 Harold, a white helicopter who flies around Sodor.
 Linda Ballantyne as Percy, a little green saddle tank engine who takes the mail train and is Thomas' best friend.
 Susan Roman as James, a red anthropomorphic mixed-traffic tender engine.
 Colm Feore as Toby, an anthropomorphic  brown square tram engine who sometimes takes Henrietta.
 Shelley-Elizabeth Skinner as Annie and Clarabel, Thomas' faithful coaches.

Production

Development
In the early 1990s, the character of Thomas the Tank Engine (adapted from the Rev. W. Awdry's Railway Series into the TV series Thomas the Tank Engine & Friends, created by Britt Allcroft) was at the height of his popularity following three successful series. At the same time, Shining Time Station (an American series that combined episodes from the previous series with original live-action characters and scenarios, also created by Allcroft along with Rick Siggelkow) was made, and also successful. As early as 1994, prior to the launch of Thomass fourth series, Britt Allcroft had plans to make a feature film based on both of these series, and would make use of the model trains from Thomas and the live-action aesthetic of Shining Time Station.

In mid to late 1995, Britt Allcroft was approached by Barry London, then vice-chairman of Paramount Pictures, with an idea for the Thomas film. In February 1996, Britt signed a contract to write the script for the film with the working title Thomas and the Magic Railroad. London's interest is thought to have stemmed from his three-year-old daughter, who was enthralled by Thomas. According to a press release, filming was to take place at Shepperton Studios, in the United Kingdom and the United States, with the theatrical release date set for 1997. However, later that year, after London left the company, Paramount shelved the plans for the film. This left Allcroft to seek other sources of funding. Discussions with PolyGram about the film were held, but not for long, because of the company being in the middle of a corporate restructuring and sale.

In the Summer of 1998, during Series 5 of Thomass production, Allcroft saw an Isle of Man Film Commission advert. They were offering tax incentives to companies wanting to film on the Island. Allcroft visited, and felt that the location was perfect. During that year, Barry London became Chairman of the newly founded Destination Films (owned by Sony Pictures). He renewed his interest in the project, and Destination Films became the main financial backer and studio for the film.

Casting
In early August 1999, it was announced that Alec Baldwin, Mara Wilson and Peter Fonda had joined the cast to play Mr. Conductor, Lily Stone and Burnett Stone respectively. David Jacobs, the former vice president of The Britt Allcroft Company, stated that Baldwin got involved in the project because his daughter Ireland was a fan of the series. John Bellis was originally attached to voice Thomas, but was replaced by Canadian actor Edward Glen. Ewan McGregor and Bob Hoskins had also expressed interest for the role. Michael Angelis, the UK narrator for the Thomas & Friends television series at the time, was originally cast to voice both James and Percy, but was later replaced by voice actresses Susan Roman and Linda Ballantyne. Keith Scott was originally set to voice Diesel 10, but was later replaced by Neil Crone in the final film. Patrick Breen (known as the narrator of Allcroft's Magic Adventures of Mumfie) was originally set to voice both Splatter and Dodge, but was eventually replaced by both Kevin Frank and Neil Crone.

Filming
Principal photography began on August 2, 1999, and wrapped on October 15, 1999. The movie was filmed at the Strasburg Rail Road in Strasburg, Pennsylvania (United States), as well as in Toronto, Ontario, Canada and on the Isle of Man. Castletown railway station on the Isle of Man Railway formed part of Shining Time Station and the goods shed at Port St Mary railway station became Burnett Stone's workshop. Running shots of the "Indian Valley" train were filmed at the Strasburg Rail Road location. The large passenger station where Lily boards the train is the Harrisburg Transportation Center. Norfolk & Western 4-8-0 475 was repainted as the Indian Valley locomotive. Sodor was realised using models and chroma key. The models were animated using live action remote control, as on the television series. The model sequences were filmed in Toronto instead of Shepperton Studios, the "home" of the original TV show; however, several of the show's key staff were flown over to participate. The Magic Railway was created using models, CGI, and water-coloured matte paintings.

Original version
In a 2007 interview with Sodor Island Forums & Fansite, writer and director Britt Allcroft revealed that before the film's theatrical release, she and editor Ron Wisman were forced to completely change the film from how she had originally written it, by removing Burnett's rival P.T. Boomer (played by Doug Lennox), who was the original antagonist and character originally responsible for wrecking Lady, because the test audiences at the March 2000 preview screenings in Los Angeles considered Boomer to "too scary" for young children. Despite most of his scenes being removed, Boomer can still be seen briefly in one scene, however the scene was redubbed with Boomer as a lost motorcyclist talking to Burnett for directions, as in the original cut, Boomer and Burnett were having a row.

Lily Stone (played by Mara Wilson) was intended to be the narrator of the story. Before filming, Thomas's voice was provided by John Bellis, a British fireman and part-time taxi driver who worked on the film as the Isle of Man transportation co-ordinator and facilities manager. Bellis received the role when he happened to pick up Britt Allcroft and her crew from the Isle of Man Airport in July 1999. According to Allcroft, after hearing him speak for the first time, she told her colleagues, "I have just heard the voice of Thomas. That man is exactly how Thomas would sound!" A few days later, she offered the role to Bellis, and he accepted. However, the test audiences felt that to his voice sounded "too old" for Thomas, although Bellis did receive onscreen credit as the Transportation Co-Ordinator, and a few of his lines remain intact in both the teaser trailer and the original UK trailer.

Crushed and angered by the changes, Bellis said he was "gutted", but still wished the filmmakers well. In an April 2000 interview, following the changes, he said, "It was supposed to be my big break, but it hasn't put me off and I am hoping something else will come along." English actor Michael Angelis, who was the UK narrator of the series at the time, was the original voice of both James and Percy, but was recast for the same reason as Bellis. Australian voice actor Keith Scott originally voiced Diesel 10 (as evidenced in both the US and UK trailers), but he believes that he was recast because test audiences claimed that his portrayal was "too scary" for young children. Additionally, American actor Patrick Breen was the original voice of both Splatter and Dodge, but he was also subsequently recast for unknown reasons.

Music and soundtrack

Thomas and the Magic Railroad is a soundtrack released on both CD and cassette on August 1, 2000. It features twelve music tracks from the feature film composed by Hummie Mann.

Release

Theatrical 
Thomas and the Magic Railroad was released theatrically on July 14, 2000, in the United Kingdom and Ireland, and on July 26, 2000, in the United States and Canada. The film was also released in Australia on December 14, 2000, and in New Zealand on April 7, 2001. Before that, the film premiered at the Odeon Leicester Square; for the purpose, a steam locomotive, no. 47298 painted to resemble Thomas, was brought to the cinema by low loader on July 9, 2000. National press coverage was low, as many journalists were concentrating on the launch of the book, Harry Potter and the Goblet of Fire, for which a special train called "Hogwarts Express" would run from July 8 to 11. In September 2020, it was announced that the film would be re-released in theaters on October 24, 2020, for the film's 20th anniversary.

Home media
Thomas and the Magic Railroad was originally released onto VHS and DVD by Icon Home Entertainment on October 19, 2000 in the United Kingdom, and by Columbia TriStar Home Video on October 31, 2000 in the United States. In 2007, the film was released as part of a double feature with The Adventures of Elmo in Grouchland. It was also released as part of a triple feature with The Adventures of Milo and Otis and The Bear.

A re-release of the film on DVD and Blu-ray as a 20th anniversary edition from Shout! Factory and under license by Sony Pictures Home Entertainment was released on September 29, 2020. The 20th anniversary edition includes a two-part documentary of the film, new interviews with the cast and crew, and a rough cut version of the film including extended and deleted scenes as well as the storyline of P.T. Boomer.

Reception

Box office
The film grossed $19.7 million worldwide against a production budget of $19 million. During its second weekend of screening in Britain, it took in £170,000.

Critical response
On Rotten Tomatoes, the film has an approval rating of 21% based on 68 reviews, along with an average rating of 3.97/10. The site's critical consensus reads, "Kids these days demand cutting edge special effects or at least a clever plot with cute characters. This movie has neither, having lost in its Americanization what the British original did so right." On Metacritic, the film has a score of 19 out of 100 based on 23 critics, indicating "overwhelming dislike". Audiences polled by CinemaScore gave the film an average grade of "B" on an A+ to F scale.

Roger Ebert of the Chicago Sun-Times gave the film one star out of four, and wrote "(the fact) That Thomas and the Magic Railroad made it into theaters at all is something of a mystery. This is a production with 'straight to video' written all over it. Kids who like the Thomas books might kinda like it. Especially younger kids. Real younger kids. Otherwise, no." While he admired the models and art direction, he criticized how the engines' mouths did not move when they spoke, the overly depressed performance of Peter Fonda, as well as the overall lack of consistency in the plot. Elvis Mitchell of The New York Times gave the film a negative review, saying, "Mr. Baldwin's attack – there's no better way to put it – is unforgettable."

William Thomas of Empire gave the film a one out of five stars, he was critical of the films special effects, stating that "believe it or not, the true villains of the piece are, in fact, the 'special' effects. Quite how – in today's era of slo-mo and seamless digital wizardry – such a shoddy result can have been achieved is anyone's guess. With clunky bluescreen, spot-a-mile-off matte work and an absolute lack of synergy between real-life and animated action, it all conspires to provide an appropriately amateur sheen." Plugged In stated, "While the animation maintains its simple appearance, the plot is anything but simple. And that's not good news for the many tots who make up the majority of Thomas audience. Switching back and forth between Shining Time and Sodor, interweaving two relatively complex story lines, may confuse more than it challenges. Parents may well find that their children are squirming in their seats long before Thomas rides his magic rails into the sunset. That said, and the magic notwithstanding, tikes who do manage to grasp the complex story lines, and can sit still for an hour and a half, will learn good lessons about friendship, courage, hard work and being kind." Nell Minow of Common Sense Media gave the film three out of five stars and writing that it "will please [Thomas fans]" but that the plot "might confuse kids".

Accolades

In other media

Video game
A video game based on the film, titled Thomas and the Magic Railroad: Print Studio, was released in the United Kingdom. Published by Hasbro Interactive, it was released for PC on August 25, 2000.

20th Anniversary Video Presentation
A special video presentation commemorating the 20th anniversary of the film and the 75th anniversary of the Thomas & Friends franchise (produced by Rainbow Sun Productions) premiered on YouTube on July 20, 2020 and was available for viewing through August 2. The four-hour event, directed by Eric Scherer, was a virtual script reading of a "reimagined extended edition" of the film, utilizing elements from the May 1999 draft, the August 1999 filmed script, and the finished 2000 film, along with new original material and live performances of the film's songs being intercut with the reading.

It featured special appearances from stars of film, television, and theatre, including Scherer (Station Announcer/Adult Patch), Stephen J. Anderson (Diesel 10), Zackary Arthur (Young Burnett), Alexander Bello (Lily and Patch's son), Kimberly J. Brown (Stacy Jones), Chelsea Davis (Mutt), Lucas Davis (The Previous Mr. Conductor), Alice Fearn (Storyteller/Adult Lily), Jake Ryan Flynn (Patch), Irene Gallin (Young Tasha/Clarabel), Michael I. Haber (Newspaper Delivery Boy), Jessa Halterman (Lily's Mother), Logan Hart (Bertie), Alex Haynes (Thomas), Theresa Jett (Passenger), Richard Kind (P.T. Boomer), Victoria Kingswood (Lily), Miriam-Teak Lee (Lady), Killian Thomas Lefevre (Toby), Noel MacNeal (Edward), Tim Mahendran (Harold), Amy Matthews (Lady Hatt), John McGowan (Mr. C. Junior), Blake Merriman (George), Harper Miles (Annie), Colin Mochrie (Burnett Stone), Michael Moore (Splatter), Katie Nail (Station Master), Angelisse Perez (Dodge), Jonah Platt (Mr. Conductor), Rob Rackstraw (James), Kyle Roberts (Percy), John Scott-Richardson (Billy Twofeathers), Carolyn Smith (Lily and Patch's daughter), Keith Wickham (Sir Topham Hatt/Gordon) and J. Paul Zimmerman (Henry). Nick Cartell served as script narrator.

Irene Gallin, Logan Hart, Jessa Halterman and Victoria Kingswood opened the presentation with a performance of "Thomas' Anthem" and later on performed "He's a Really Useful Engine". Dayna Manning performed a new version of "I Know How The Moon Must Feel" during its respective scene in the presentation. Arun Blair-Mangat and Miriam-Teak Lee performed a cover of "Some Things Never Leave You", as did Eric Scherer and Katie Nail with "Shining Time". Scherer also performed "Summer Sunday" during the scene where Mr. Conductor calls Mr. C. Junior. Three songs from the original series that were not heard in the original film were covered in this version: Connor Warren Smith, Jake Ryan Flynn and Alexander Bello performed "It's Great to be an Engine" during the scene where Mr. C. Junior and Lily arrive in the Island of Sodor following their flight over the Magic Railroad; Eric Scherer and Katie Nail performed "Night Train" during the scene where Thomas and Percy come to the realization about the Magic Railroad's existence; and Bradley Dean and Alice Fearn performed "The Island Song" after the climatic chase scene. Cut and extended sequences, particularly those featuring P.T. Boomer, were restored for this reading. Edward and George the Steamroller, two characters from the franchise who did not appear in the original scripts and 2000 film, were incorporated into this version. Edward is portrayed here as the train who takes Sir Topham Hatt and Lady Hatt on their holiday, thus explaining his absence from the film.

The presentation concluded with a performance of "The Locomotion" by members of the Off-Broadway and West End companies of Bat Out of Hell: The Musical. 100% of the donations collected prior to and during the presentation went directly to the Autistic Self Advocacy Network.

Legacy

Cancelled sequel
On July 1, 2000, it was reported that Destination Films began development on a sequel, but it was quietly cancelled.

Potential animated adaptation film
HiT said that its theatrical division would be piloted by a Thomas film. Originally targeted for a late 2010 release, in September 2009 this was revised to Spring 2011. As of January 2011, the release date had been pushed back further, to 2012. The initial draft of the script was written by Josh Klausner, who has also said that the film would be set around the times of World War II; Will McRobb and Chris Viscardi also helped write the script. On June 8, 2011, it was announced that 9 director Shane Acker would direct the live-action adaptation of The Adventures of Thomas, with Weta Digital designing the film's visual effects.

On October 6, 2020, it was announced that Marc Forster would be directing a new theatrical live-action/animated Thomas & Friends movie. According to Mattel Films Schedule release, the film is titled Thomas & Friends: The Movie.

Notes

References

External links

 Official website archived from the original on August 15, 2000
 
 Cinema.com: Thomas and the Magic Railroad

2000 films
2000 directorial debut films
2000 fantasy films
2000s children's adventure films
2000s children's fantasy films
2000s fantasy adventure films
American children's fantasy films
American children's adventure films
American fantasy adventure films
Animated films about trains
British children's adventure films
British children's fantasy films
British fantasy adventure films
Children's fantasy films
Crossover films
Destination Films films
2000s English-language films
Films scored by Hummie Mann
Films about friendship
Films about size change
Films based on television series
Films directed by Britt Allcroft
Films produced by Britt Allcroft
Films set in Cumbria
Films set on islands
Films set on trains
Films shot in Ontario
Films shot in Pennsylvania
Films using stop-motion animation
Films with live action and animation
Films with screenplays by Britt Allcroft
Mattel Creations films
Thomas & Friends
Gullane Entertainment
Icon Productions films
2000s American films
2000s British films